The Finland national under-21 speedway team is the national under-21 motorcycle speedway team of Finland and is controlled by the Finnish Motorcycling Federation. The team entered the Under-21 World Cup three times, but they never qualified for the final. Ari Koponen is the only Finnish rider to win a medal in Individual U-21 European Championship open for riders from all continents (1979).

Competition

See also 
 Finland national speedway team
 Finland national under-19 speedway team

External links 
 (fi) Finnish Motorcycling Federation webside

National speedway teams
Speedway
Team